Sanguisorba officinalis, commonly known as great burnet, is a plant in the family Rosaceae, subfamily Rosoideae. It is native throughout the cooler regions of the Northern Hemisphere in Europe, northern Asia, and northern North America.

It is a herbaceous perennial plant growing to 1 m tall, which occurs in grasslands, growing well on grassy banks. It flowers June or July.

Sanguisorba officinalis is an important food plant for the European large blue butterflies Phengaris nausithous and P. teleius.

Commercial uses
Use is made of its extensive root system for erosion control, as well as a bioremediator, used to reclaim derelict sites such as landfills.

Ornamental
Sanguisorba officinalis is one of several Sanguisorba species cultivated as ornamental plants. The cultivar 'Tanna' is widely available, and has won the Royal Horticultural Society's Award of Garden Merit. The synonym Sanguisorba menziesii is also listed as having gained the Award.

Ethnomedical uses
It has been used in traditional Chinese medicine (TCM) where it is known by the name Di Yu. It is said to cool the blood, stop bleeding, clear heat, and heal wounds  (Chinese Herbal Materia Medica by Dan Bensky).

Specifically, the root is used to stop bloody dysentery, nosebleeds, and is applied topically to treat burns and insect bites.

Phytochemistry
Sanguiin H-6 is a dimeric ellagitannin that can be found in S. officinalis.

Ziyuglycoside II is a triterpenoid saponin that can be found in S. officinalis.

References

officinalis
Medicinal plants
Plants described in 1753
Taxa named by Carl Linnaeus